Halocynthiibacter is a genus of bacteria in the family Rhodobacteraceae.

References

Further reading 
 
 
 

Rhodobacteraceae
Bacteria genera